In the Devi Mahatmya, Sumbha (शुम्भ) and Nisumbha (निशुम्भ), were two asuras that confronted, and were ultimately slain by Kaushiki; an avatar of Devi Chandi.

In the Devi Mahatmyam
The story of Sumbha and Nisumbha begins in the fifth chapter of the Devi Mahatmyam. Parvati relates how two brothers of Asura stock sought to conquer the Three Worlds by subjecting themselves to severe penance and purification rituals so that no man or demon could destroy them. Sumbha and Nisumbha traveled to Pushkara, a sacred place, and remained there in prayer for ten thousand years. God Brahma saw the brothers' penance, and was pleased, granting them the boon they requested.

It was at this time that Chanda and Munda, two lesser Asuras in the service of Shumbha, encountered Parvati, and were overwhelmed by her beauty. They carried reports of this goddess to Shumbha, who sought to possess Parvati and her beauty. Shumbha sent the demon Sugriva (asura) to court Parvati, but she rejected his advances. It was then decided by the demonic brothers that if Parvati would not come willingly, they would have to abduct her. First the demon Dhumralochana and his army of sixty-thousand Asuras were sent to abduct Parvati, but she took the form of Durga and managed to slay the entire army. Next, Chanda and Munda were deployed, then Parvati destroyed them. Parvati got the epithet Chamunda from destroying Chanda and Munda. Finally Raktabīja was sent, but was slain by Goddess Kali.

Death

After these encounters, Sumbha and Nisumbha had no choice but to meet Parvati in direct combat. Although Brahma's boon had granted the brothers protection against men and demons, no such protection existed against goddesses. Nisumbha was the first to fall, after assaulting Parvati's lion. Upon seeing the death of his brother, Shumbha went after Parvati in a rage, but was ultimately cleaved in two by the Goddess' trident. With Sumbha and Nisumbha gone, the Three Worlds returned to their ordinary state of being, rid of a great evil.

In popular culture
Some, such as John Stratton Hawley and Donna Marie Wulff, see Shumbha and Nishumbha as symbols of arrogance and pride which is ultimately overcome by Parvati's humility and wisdom. In Shashi Tharoor's satirical novel The Great Indian Novel, the story of Sumbha and Nisumbha is used both as a warning against the dangers of seduction, and as a metaphor for the collapse of the relationship between the five Pandavas. There is also a Kannada Movie by the name of Shumba Nishumba and tell the story of Asuras and Parvati.

See also
 Chanda and Munda
 Mahishasura
 Raktabīja
 Rambha (asura)
 Dhumralochana
 Sugriva (asura)

References

External links
English translation of the Devi Mahatmyam
Devī Māhātmya - Sanskrit original in pdf form.

Danavas